Richardia is a genus of flies in the family Richardiidae. It was first described by French entomologist Jean-Baptiste Robineau-Desvoid in 1830. It occurs from Mexico to Central and South America.

Description 
The genus includes species with strongly enlarged heads (hypercephalism) and "eyestalks" (eyes inserted in the lateral projection of the head) such as the males R. telescopica and R. stylops. Stalk-eyed flies in family Diopsidae have their antennae located on the stalk, rather than in the middle of the head as in Richardiidae.

Taxonomy 
The Richardia genus comprises the following species:
 Richardia advena
 Richardia analis Hendel, 1911
 Richardia annulata (Macquart, 1835
 Richardia calcarata Hendel, 1912
 Richardia centraliamericana Hennig, 1937
 Richardia concinna Wulp, 1899
 Richardia eburneosignata Hennig, 1937
 Richardia elegans Wulp, 1899
 Richardia flavipes Schiner, 1868
 Richardia hendeliana Enderlein, 1913
 Richardia infestans Enderlein, 1912
 Richardia laeta Walker, 1853
 Richardia laterina Rondani, 1848
 Richardia latibrachium Enderlein, 1912
 Richardia lichtwardti Hendel, 1911
 Richardia numerifera Speiser, 1911
 Richardia pectinata Hendel, 1912
 Richardia podagrica Fabricius, 1805
 Richardia proxima Schiner, 1868
 Richardia saltatoria Robineau-Desvoidy, 1830
 Richardia schnusei Hendel, 1911
 Richardia stylops Hennig, 1938
 Richardia teevani Curran, 1934
 Richardia telescopica Gerstaecker, 1860
 Richardia tephritina Enderlein, 191
 Richardia tuberculata Hendel, 1911
 Richardia undulata Hennig, 1937
 Richardia unifasciata Rondani, 1848
 Richardia unimaculata Hendel, 1911
 Richardia viridiventris Wulp, 1899

References

Tephritoidea genera
Tephritoidea